Bátorliget (before 1975: Aporliget) is a village in Szabolcs-Szatmár-Bereg county, in the Northern Great Plain region of eastern Hungary.

The village (then named Aporliget) was the last one to be electrified in the country, on August 20, 1963, thus completing the 75-year-long process of electrification (which incidentally started in a nearby town, Mátészalka, in 1888).

Geography

Nearby is Bátorliget Pasture NCA (Nature Conservation Area).

References

Populated places in Szabolcs-Szatmár-Bereg County